Jen Liu (born 1976) is an American visual artist. She works with video, performance, and painting and creates pieces about labor, economy and national identity. She was awarded a Guggenheim and a Creative Capital award.

Education and career

She received a BA from Oberlin College, and an MFA from the California Institute of the Arts, and is a full-time faculty member at Bennington College. Liu is represented by Upstream Gallery.

Works 
Liu's work explore labor and gender. Her 2016 video, The Pink Detachment, is a reinterpretation of The Red Detachment of Women (1970), a Model Opera ballet from China’s Cultural Revolution. It premiered at the Berlinale Forum Expanded exhibition.

Her Pink Slime Caesar Shift series contains videos and animations that tell a story of female factory workers in South China altering the DNA of cow cells to transmit messages. Liu was awarded grants for this series from Creative Capital, and the Los Angeles County Museum of Art. It was featured in a solo exhibition at Upstream Gallery.

Awards 
Liu has been awarded a Guggenheim Fellowship (2017), NYFA Fellowship, Los Angeles County Museum of Art Art+Technology Award (2018), a Creative Capital Award (2019), and a Pollock-Krasner Foundation grant.

Solo exhibitions (selection)
2020 
Jen Liu + Aleksandra Domanovic, MAK Center for Art + Architecture in collaboration with LACMA, Los Angeles
Jen Liu, ARIEL Platform for Feminist Art, Copenhagen
GOLD LOOP, solo commissioned video, curated by Christina Millare, funded by the British Arts Council
2019 
PINK SLIME CAESAR SHIFT: GOLD EDITION, commissioned choreographic performance and installation, curated by Renan Laruan as part of the Singapore Biennale 2019
2018 
PINK SLIME CAESAR SHIFT, Upstream Gallery, Amsterdam
2017 
The Red Detachment: Bai Wei’s Natural History¬, solo commission by
OK.Video/ruangruppa, Bogor Zoology Museum, Bogor
2016 
Digital Billboard Platform: Jen Liu’s The Pink Detachment, LAXART, Los Angeles
The Red Detachment of Women: Online, commissioned by Triple Canopy as part of the Standards issue
Utopia is No Place, Utopia is Process - Usdan Gallery, Bennington College, Bennington Vermong
The Pink Detachment, 66th Berlinale, Berlin 
2015 
The Red Detachment of Women: Performance for 6 Dancers, co- commissioned by Triple Canopy and The Whitney Museum, Whitney Museum, New York

References

Living people
American artists
Oberlin College alumni
California Institute of the Arts alumni
Bennington College faculty
1976 births
American artists of Asian descent
21st-century American artists